Luke Bambridge (born 21 January 1995) is a British former tennis player. A doubles specialist, he reached a career-high Association of Tennis Professionals (ATP) world No. 41 doubles ranking in May 2019.

His career highlights included winning three ATP Tour titles, 7 ATP Challenger Tour titles, 20 ITF doubles titles and 1 ITF singles title.

Tennis career

2011
Great Britain won the 2011 Junior Davis Cup tournament for the first time after beating Italy in the final in San Luis Potosí, Mexico. Coached by Greg Rusedski, the team of Bambridge, Kyle Edmund, and Evan Hoyt justified their top seeding in the event.

2013
Bambridge won four ITF doubles tournaments with different partners in Great Britain, Israel, and Greece.

2014
Seven more ITF doubles tournament wins by Bambridge in 2014, five with Liam Broady as his partner.

2015
Bambridge received a wildcard into the 2015 Wimbledon Championships men's doubles event, partnering Liam Broady where he made his grand slam debut. 2015 was also the year in which Bambridge won his first singles ITF tournament at the Qatar F4 Futures.

2019
Bambridge, in partnership with Ben McLachlan, reached his first Grand Slam quarterfinal at the 2019 US Open. The pairing beat ninth seeds Nikola Mektić and Franko Škugor in the second round, before exiting against top seeds Juan Sebastián Cabal and Robert Farah in the last eight.

ATP career finals

Doubles: 9 (3 titles, 6 runners-up)

ITF Career finals

Singles: 7 (1–6)

Doubles: 56 (27–29)

Doubles performance timeline

Current after the 2021 US Open.

World TeamTennis

Bambridge made his World TeamTennis debut in 2019 with the Orange County Breakers. It was announced that he will be return with the Orange County Breakers during the 2020 WTT season set to begin July 12.

References

External links
 
 

1995 births
Living people
Sportspeople from Nottingham
English male tennis players
British male tennis players
Tennis people from Nottinghamshire
People educated at West Bridgford School